Omladinski košarkaški klub Konstantin, commonly referred to as OKK Konstantin or simply Konstantin, is a men's professional basketball club based in Niš, Serbia. They are currently competing in the Second Basketball League of Serbia.

Home arena

Konstantin plays their domestic home games at the Čair Sports Center, located in Niš. It has a seating capacity of 4,000.

Players 

 Aleksandar Mladenović

Coaches 

  Jovica Antonić (2011–2012)
  Boško Đokić (2012–2013)
  Marko Cvetković (2013–2016)
  Predrag Jaćimović (2016–2017)
  Marko Cvetković (2017)
  Slobodan Nikolić (2018)
  Marko Cvetković (2018–2020)
  Dušan Radović (2020–2021)
  Ljubiša Damjanović (2021–present)

See also 
 KK Ergonom

References

External links
 OKK Konstantin at kls.rs
 OKK Konstantin at eurobasket.com

Basketball teams in Serbia
Basketball teams established in 2009
Sport in Niš